Dolour is a band led by Shane Tutmarc.

History
Dolour was formed in Seattle, Washington, releasing their debut 7" in mid-1998 on Theory Records, and two self-released EPs before releasing their first album Waiting For A World War in April 2001 on Sonic Boom Records. By the release of Waiting for a World War, Dolour had become a solo project for Tutmarc. Tutmarc recorded Suburbiac, released on Fugitive Records in 2002, with producer Aaron Sprinkle. The self-produced New Old Friends (2004) was released on Made In Mexico Records in November 2004. In 2005, A Matter of Time: 2000-2005, an anthology, was released by Japanese label Quince Records. During 2004-2006 Dolour produced two separate albums, Hell or Highwater and Storm & Stress, which were combined and released on Japanese label Quince Records as The Years in the Wilderness in 2007.

Tutmarc began a side project in early 2007 called Shane Tutmarc & The Traveling Mercies. On December 6, 2007, Tutmarc announced the end of Dolour as he focused his efforts on this new project.

After Tutmarc pursued a solo career, Dolour became active again in 2020, releasing the album The Royal We, and in April 2021, the album Televangelist.  In 2021, Dolour also released the album Origin Story, comprising re-recorded songs from previous releases.

Discography

Studio albums
 Waiting for a World War (2001) Produced by Blake Wescott and Dolour. Sonic Boom Recordings
 Suburbiac (2002) Produced by Aaron Sprinkle and Shane Tutmarc. Fugitive Recordings
 New Old Friends (2004) Produced by Shane Tutmarc. Made in Mexico Records
 The Years in the Wilderness (2007) Produced by Shane Tutmarc. Quince Records (Japan)
 The Royal We (2020) Produced by Shane Tutmarc.  Inverness Recordings
 Televangelist (2021) Produced by Shane Tutmarc.  Inverness Recordings
 Origin Story (2021) Produced by Shane Tutmarc.  Inverness Recordings

EPs
 CPR (2003) - Promo CDEP for the forthcoming New Old Friends. Featuring "(Why Don't You] Come Around" later released on "A Matter of Time" collection.
Collection
 A Matter of Time: 2000-2005 (2005) - Featuring songs from the first three albums, plus the previously unreleased title-track, and rarities. Quince Records (Japan)

Singles
 The Shivering/That Dreadful Anthem 7" (1998) Produced by Aaron Sprinkle. Theory Records
 Iceland/The Ballad 7" (2001) - Early versions of Iceland, and So Done With You which were re-recorded for Suburbiac. West of January Records.

Compilations
 Menage A Trois (pre-Suburbiac 2001 recording) - Eighteen NW Bands for RAINN Benefit (2001)
 This Whole World - Making God Smile: An Artists' Tribute to the Songs of Beach Boy Brian Wilson (2002)
 Subject: I Called Your Name - All That Was Built Here (Ten Years At The Old Fire House) (2002)
 You Can't Make New Old Friends - In Honor: A Compilation to Beat Cancer (2004)
 An Easy Life (pre-Years in the Wilderness 2004 recording) - Various Artists - We Make Our Own Mistakes, Volume One (2005)
 Eye For An Eye and It's All Up To You - One Voice for Home: A Collection of Music by Artists Against Violence (2007)
 I Need A New Mentor (previously unreleased 2006 recording) - "Three Imaginary Girls 10th Anniversary Mix CD" (2012)

References

External links
Dolour on Bandcamp - CDs, Vinyl, Cassettes
[ Allmusic biography]

Interviews
 ALLALOM Music Shane Tutmarc Interview, by Samuel Aaron
 ALLALOM Music Shane Tutmarc Interview by Samuel Aaron

Indie rock musical groups from Washington (state)
Musical groups established in 1997
Musical groups disestablished in 2007